Marisa Del Frate (11 March 1931 – 5 February 2015) was an Italian actress, singer, and television personality.

Life and career
Born in Rome, Del Frate started her career as a model and took part in several beauty contests. In 1957, she successfully debuted as a singer winning the Festival di Napoli with the song "Malinconico autunno".

In 1958, Del Frate entered the competition at the Sanremo Music Festival with the songs "Quando il cuore" and "Ho disegnato un cuore". Shortly later, she was chosen by Erminio Macario as primadonna in the revue Chiamate Arturo 777; from then, Del Frate started a successful career as soubrette, actress, and television presenter. In 1961, Del Frate obtained large popularity thanks to the RAI television variety L'amico del giaguaro.

Death
Marisa Del Frate died from cancer at age 83 in Rome in 2015.

Discography

Album
   1961 -  Le canzoni de L'amico del giaguaro

Singles
     1957: "Malinconico autunno"  (Cetra SP 44) 
     1957: "Io e Ciccio cha cha cha" (Cetra, DC 6726)
     1957: "Bene mio"  (Cetra, DC 6771)
     1957: "'O treno d'a fantasia" (Cetra, DC 6792)
     1958: "Maistrale" (Cetra SP 243)
     1958: "Maria Canaria"  (Cetra, DC 6868)
     1958: "Vita mia"  (Cetra, DC 6871)
     1958: "Un poco 'e sentimento" (Cetra, DC 6872)
     1958: "È stato il vento" (Cetra, DC 6873)
     1958: "Calypso melody" (Cetra, DC 6874)
     1958: "Maistrale" (Cetra, DC 6930)
     1958:  "Sincerità" (Cetra, DC 6931)
     1958:  "'O calyppese napulitano" (Cetra, DC 6932)
     1958:  "Guardandoci" (Cetra, DC 6989)
     1958:  "Con te per l'eternità" (Cetra, DC 6991)
     1958: "La donna di Marzo" (Cetra, DC 6992)
     1958:  "Per credere nel mondo" (Cetra, DC 6993)
     1958:  "Dominique / Autunno" (with Erminio Macario) (Cetra, DC 6988)
     1958: "E' molto facile...dirsi addio"  (Cetra, AC 3329) 
     1965: "I pensieri dell'amore" (CBS, 1611)
     1965: "Anche se" (Derby, DB 5123)
     1967: "Perché ci sei tu"  (CBS, 2980)

Filmography
 Perdono (1966)
 La ballata dei mariti (1963)
 Obiettivo ragazze (1963)
 Addio per sempre!'' (1958)

References

External links
 Marisa Del Frate profile, Discogs.com; accessed 2 March 2015. 

1931 births
2015 deaths
Italian pop singers
Italian television personalities
Italian film actresses
Italian stage actresses
Musicians from Rome
Deaths from cancer in Lazio
20th-century Italian women singers